The National Polytechnic School (Spanish: Escuela Politécnica Nacional), also known as EPN, is a public university in Quito, Ecuador. The campus, called "José Rubén Orellana", is located at the sector center-oriental of Quito. It occupies an area of 15.2 hectares and has a built area of around 62,000 metres2. Its student body numbers approximately 10,000 of which thirty percent are women. The main campus encompasses ten teaching and research faculties, in addition to four technical and specialized institutes. EPN was founded in 1869 with the aim of becoming the first technical and technological center in the country. Since its beginnings, EPN adopted the polytechnic university model, which stresses laboratory instruction in applied science and engineering. At the campus, there are some libraries with a content primarily oriented to engineering and scientific topics.

EPN has been consistently ranked among the top universities (the so-called Group A) in Ecuador by CEAACES.

History 
The National Polytechnic School was founded on August 27, 1869 by the National Convention of Ecuador and the former Ecuadorian President Gabriel García Moreno. EPN is the second-oldest public university in Ecuador, after Central University of Ecuador.

For this purpose, García Moreno hired members of a German Jesuit religious order to manage the university and the Quito Astronomical Observatory. Juan Bautista Menten, Louis Dressel, Theodor Wolf, Joseph Kolberg and Luis Sodiro were among the first scientists who taught at the EPN. It received the name of "Instituto Superior Politecnico", and Menten was its first director; some other notable professors include: Emilio Muellendorf, Armando Wenzel, Cristian Boetzkes, José Epping, Eduardo Brugier, Luis Heiss, Alberto Claessen, P. Clemente Faller; and Joseph Honshteter. The newborn institution was conceived as the first research center of Ecuador and was created with the purpose of contributing to the scientific and technological development of the country. And these academics excelled in several fields such as cartography and mineralogy (Wolf), Chemistry (Dressel), Botany (Sodiro), Architecture (Kolberg), and other fields of engineering. The advent of electricity to the city of Quito was in part the work of Kolberg and Brugier.

The university was closed by president Borrero in 1876 and remained closed for some decades. In February 1935, President José María Velasco Ibarra re-opened it and in 1946 the name was changed to Escuela Politecnica Nacional. In 1964, the university moved from its old campus near "La Alameda" park to its current campus in El Giron, which was named after former Rector José Rubén Orellana Ricaurte. EPN offers many degrees in engineering and science including civil engineering, electric and electronic engineering, mechanical engineering, power electronics, petroleum engineering, chemical engineering, bio-agricultural engineering, food technology, geology, informatics engineering, mathematics and physics. In addition to science and engineering degrees, EPN also started offering technical and technological degrees, with the School of Information and Technology being founded in 1967.

Faculties

The university has 8 faculties that house 24 professional undergraduate schools, 18 master's degrees and 6 postgraduate doctorates. These specialties belong to the field of knowledge of science, engineering and technical training school (ESFOT). All professional faculties, except the Technical Training School, offer masters and doctorates in various fields of specialization.

 Administrative Sciences
 Chemical Engineering and Agro-Industry
 Civil and Environmental Engineering
 Computer Science Engineering
 Electrical and Electronics Engineering
 Geology and Petroleum
 Mechanical Engineering
 Exact Sciences: Mathematics, Physics

Technical Training School 
The Technical Training School (ESFOT) has been in operation since 1967 and has a focus on Computer Networking, Telecommunications networking and teaching all about Computer programming and how computers exchange data.

Volcanic monitoring 

In Ecuador, the National Polytechnic School department looks to the monitoring of the volcanic activity in this andean nation.
Some consider it the world's highest active volcano, while others give this status to the considerably higher Llullaillaco, which most recently erupted in 1877 and is one of Ecuador's most active volcanoes. Since 1738, Cotopaxi has erupted more than 50 times, resulting in the creation of numerous valleys formed by lahars (mudflows) around the volcano.

In October 1999, Pichincha Volcano erupted in Quito and covered the city with several inches of ash. Prior to that, the last major eruptions were in 1553 and in 1660, when about 30 cm of ash fell on the city.

At 5230 meters, Sangay Volcano) is an active stratovolcano in central Ecuador and is one of the highest active volcanoes in the world and one of Ecuador's most active ones, erupting three times in recorded history. It exhibits mostly strombolian activity; the most recent eruption, which started in 1934, is still ongoing. Geologically, Sangay marks the southern bound of the Northern Volcanic Zone, and its position straddling two major pieces of crust accounts for its high level of activity. Sangay's approximately 500,000-year-old history is one of instability; two previous versions of the mountain were destroyed in massive flank collapses, evidence of which still litters its surroundings today. Sangay is one of two active volcanoes located within the namesake Sangay National Park, the other being Tungurahua to the north. As such it has been listed as a UNESCO World Heritage Site since 1983.

Reventador is an active stratovolcano which lies in the eastern Andes of Ecuador. Since 1541 it has erupted over 25 times with most recent eruption in 2009, but the largest historical eruption occurred in 2002. During that eruption the plume from the volcano reached a height of 17 km and pyroclastic flows went up to 7 km from the cone. On March 30, 2007, the mountain spewed ash again. The ash reached a height of about two miles (3 km, 11,000 ft).

Cotopaxi, outside of Quito started activity in April 2015, the volcano began to show signs of unrest, and came back to life. There was a large increase in earthquakes (including harmonic tremors) and SO2 emissions. IGPEN reported slight deformation of the edifice, suggesting an intrusion of magma under the volcano. As of 25 July, the unrest continued, and the most recent major eruption was an ash and steam eruption that occurred on August 14 and 15, 2015.

Gustavo Orcés V. Natural History Museum 

The Gustavo Orcés V. Natural History Museum is part of the Life Sciences Institute on the campus of the National Polytechnic School. The main focus is the conducting research in the Ecuadorian fauna in the fields of biodiversity, ecology, zoology, and environmental impact assessments and contributes to national environmental culture through the Natural History Museum Gustavo Orces.

The museum has the remains of the only complete mammoth found in Ecuador.

See also
List of astronomical observatories
List of universities in Ecuador

References

External links
  National Polytechnic School official website 

1869 establishments in Ecuador
Educational institutions established in 1869
Public universities
Technical universities and colleges
Universities in Quito
Astronomical observatories in Ecuador
Museums in Quito
Buildings and structures in Quito